Dhavalambari (pronounced ) is a rāgam in Carnatic music (musical scale of South Indian classical music). It is the 49th Melakarta rāgam in the 72 melakarta rāgam system of Carnatic music.

Structure and Lakshana

It is the 1st rāgam in the 9th chakra Brahma. The mnemonic name is Brahma-Pa. The mnemonic phrase is sa ra gu mi pa dha na. Its  structure (ascending and descending scale) is as follows (see swaras in Carnatic music for details on below notation and terms):
: 
: 
(the notes used in this scale are shuddha rishabham, antara gandharam, prati madhyamam, shuddha dhaivatham, shuddha nishadham)

As it is a melakarta rāgam, by definition it is a sampoorna rāgam (has all seven notes in ascending and descending scale). It is the prati madhyamam equivalent of Gayakapriya, which is the 13th melakarta.

Janya rāgams 
Dhavalambari has a few minor janya rāgams (derived scales) associated with it. See List of janya rāgams for all janya rāgams associated with Dhavalambari.

Compositions
A few compositions set to Dhavalambari are:

Karvaya kanda by Koteeswara Iyer
Srivani pustaka pani by Dr. M. Balamuralikrishna
Sringaradi by Muthuswami Dikshitar

Related rāgams
This section covers the theoretical and scientific aspect of this rāgam.

Dhavalambari's notes when shifted using Graha bhedam, yields no other melakarta rāgam. Graha bhedam is the step taken in keeping the relative note frequencies same, while shifting the shadjam to the next note in the rāgam.

Notes

References

Melakarta ragas